The A72 is an autoroute (motorway) in France.

The motorway is operated by Autoroutes du Sud de la France (ASF) and links Balbigny to Saint-Étienne on one of the steepest and meandrous motorways in France. Over  of the motorway is limited to 110 km/h (70 mph) as sections are considered too dangerous for the standard 130 km/h (80 mph) speed limit.

The motorway has 2 lanes both directions with 3 lane sections near Saint-Étienne.

The road is also numbered the European route E70.  In 2006, the section between Clermont-Ferrand and the A89 spur became part of the A89.

Junctions

External links

A72 autoroute in Saratlas

A72